Croatia participated in the Junior Eurovision Song Contest five times, and won the inaugural edition in . Croatian broadcaster  (HRT), a member organisation of the European Broadcasting Union (EBU), were responsible for the country's participation. Croatia participated in the first four editions, from 2003 to 2006, organising a national final to select the country's entrant. The first representative to participate for Croatia was Dino Jelusić with the song "", which finished in first place out of sixteen participating entries, with a score of 134 points. In 2014, Josie finished in last place for Croatia with the song "Game Over", after which HRT again withdrew from competing the following year.

History
Croatia are one of the sixteen countries to have made their debut at the inaugural Junior Eurovision Song Contest 2003, which took place on 15 November 2003 at the Forum in Copenhagen, Denmark. After problems occurred with the prospective host for the 2004 contest, Croatian broadcaster Hrvatska radiotelevizija (HRT) stepped in to host the contest. However, this was later abandoned after it was revealed the venue HRT had planned on using for the contest was to be in use during the period of the contest. HRT was one of six other broadcasters to enter a bid to host the 2005 contest, however this was unsuccessful. Croatia also expressed an interest in hosting the 2006 contest and made another unsuccessful bid to host the 2007 contest.  HRT withdrew from the 2007 contest, due to expense and difficulties in broadcasting the contest live.

On 23 September 2014, it was announced that Croatia could possibly return to the 2014 contest in Marsa, Malta due to a tweet composed by the Executive Supervisor of the Junior Eurovision Song Contest, Vladislav Yakovlev. Their return was officially confirmed by the EBU on 26 September 2014, with the 2014 contest being scheduled to be broadcast on HRT 2. On 23 June 2015, it was announced that HRT would withdraw from the 2015 contest, leaving Croatia out of the edition which took place in Bulgaria. On 17 August 2016, HRT ruled out a return to the 2016 contest. On 20 May 2017, the Croatian broadcaster announced their ambitions to return to the 2017 contest in Tbilisi. However, Croatia was not on the final list of participants released by the EBU and did not compete in the contest.

Participation overview

Commentators and spokespersons

The contests are broadcast online worldwide through the official Junior Eurovision Song Contest website junioreurovision.tv and YouTube. In 2015, the online broadcasts featured commentary in English by junioreurovision.tv editor Luke Fisher and 2011 Bulgarian Junior Eurovision Song Contest entrant Ivan Ivanov. The Croatian broadcaster, HRT, sent their own commentator to each contest in order to provide commentary in Croatian. Spokespersons were also chosen by the national broadcaster in order to announce the awarding points from Croatia. The table below list the details of each commentator and spokesperson since 2003.

See also
Croatia in the Eurovision Song Contest – Senior version of the Junior Eurovision Song Contest.
Croatia in the Eurovision Young Dancers – A competition organised by the EBU for younger dancers aged between 16 and 21.
Croatia in the Eurovision Young Musicians – A competition organised by the EBU for musicians aged 18 years and younger.

References

Countries in the Junior Eurovision Song Contest
Eurovision, Junior